"Never Say Never" is a song written, performed and produced by British electronic music duo Basement Jaxx. Featuring vocals from Elliot Marshall (credited under the stage name "ETML"), it was written by Simon Ratcliffe, Felix Buxton and Marshall. A soulful disco, house, R&B pop song, it was compared to the works of artists including Calvin Harris, SBTRKT, Womack & Womack and Gavin DeGraw, and labels such as Ministry of Sound and West End Records. The song was well received by critics, with praise going towards the group's roots that never made the sound too dated.

"Never Say Never" was released on 27 June 2014, as a single off their 2014 album Junto. Remixes by Tiësto, MOTi, Gotsome Bring It Back, Wayward and Mark Knight have also came out, as well as an extended mix of the original song. In the group's home country, it reached number 18 on the UK Indie Chart. Elsewhere it became a number-one hit on the American Billboard Hot Dance Club Songs chart, and the duo's fourth song to top that chart. It also appeared on record charts in Australia, Belgium and Japan. The official accompanying music video, written and directed by Saman Kesh, premiered on 21 July 2014, and follows Japanese scientists trying to make a twerking robot.

Production and composition
"Never Say Never" was written by Simon Ratcliffe, Felix Buxton and Elliot Marshall. It was produced by the former two, with Baunz handling co-production. In addition to the lead vocals from Marshall (who is credited under "ETML"), the track also features backing vocals from Yzabel, as well as kids chorus vocals from Amara Charles, Kiarah and Shamouy Mills-Foster. It is a soulful mid-tempo disco house R&B pop song. Introduced with "deceptively cinematic strings" and a "vintage, slightly dusty" piano, "dub-leaning" bass and drums are also present in the arrangement. Many critics noted it to be more relaxed and less cartoonishness than many of Basement Jaxx's other songs.

Benjamin Aspray, a writer for PopMatters, compared it to records released by Ministry of Sound and West End Records. Adam Workman, in his review for the Abu Dhabi newspaper The National, noted it to be in the style of Calvin Harris, while Sean Thomas of Drowned in Sound and entertainment.ie's Rory Cashin described it as a SBTRKTy track. The 405 author Lyle Bignon said the song "take[s] us back to a warehouse somewhere in Brixton circa 1998, rushing hard and loving the vibe along with another five hundred party heads." Jon O'Brien of Mimo said the melody might've been taken from the song "Teardrops" by Womack & Womack, while FDRMX Taylor Lindsay noted it to have a chord structure similar to songs by Gavin DeGraw.

Release and remixes
The original mix of "Never Say Never" was initially released worldwide on 27 June 2014, and was sent to dance/EDM stations on 1 July. It is a single off their sixth studio album Junto where it is listed as the fourth track. Special editions of the album have also came with an extended mix of the song. Tiësto's remix he did with MOTi was issued on 22 July. The original track came out with the Gotsome Bring It Back and Wayward remixes in digital stores on 15 August. On 2 September, Mart Knight's remix of the song was released.

On the UK Indie Chart, "Never Say Never" peaked at number 18. It reached number seven and 14 on the Belgian Ultratip chart, and also 24 and 20 on the dance chart, in Flanders and Wallonia respectively. In the United States, it became a topper of the Billboard  Hot Dance Club Songs chart. It was their fourth in their entire career and also their first in 14 years since "Bingo Bango" was number one in July 2000. It was also in the top 20 of the Dance/Electronic Songs chart, where it peaked at number 18. In Japan, it had a peak of number 68 on the Japan Hot 100, and was also number ten on the Overseas chart. The single packaged with Mark Knight, Got Some, Wayward and instrumental mixes of the song reached number 15 on the Australian ARIA club chart.

Critical reception
"Never Say Never" earned positive reviews from critics. Angus Fitz-Bugden, in a Renowned for Sound article reviewing the single, gave it three-and-a-half stars out of five, praising the "vulnerable sensuality" of ETML's vocal performance and writing that Basement Jaxx "have managed to stay true to the sound that earned them their place with fans worldwide but without sounding dated." James West of DIY called it an "undeniably an instantly-rousing summer smash in waiting, even if vocal sensation [ETML] makes blatant advances towards that already-fiercely-competitive boyish soul futurist throne (watch out Sam Smith, John Newman et al)." In an Allmusic review, Heather Phares honored it as a "AMG pick track", opining the duo's roots present "never feels too self-conscious". Taylor Lindsay of FDRMX called it a standout of Junto, opining that "not ecstatic, but where it doesn't thrill, it innovates." He also gave liking to the pop elements, saying that they don't "go beyond flirting with it." Stereogum's Tom Breihan wrote that the song proved "their fundamentals are still strong". On 7 July 2014, Digital Spy staff members Lewis Corner and Amy Davidson named "Never Say Never" one of the "10 tracks you need to hear", writing that "Waves of signature Basement Jaxx beats washing over distinctive dance hooks affirm that time lapse aside, the British pair are still reigning over their genre."

Writing for musicOMH, Larry Day described it as "big, stadium-y and has a lovely R&B vocal line." Spin writer Colin Stutz highlighted the hook of the song that was "ripe for raving", and described it as "just plain blissful." He also praised the group's maturity present in the song. Chris Coplan of Consequence of Sound assumed that "One could easily enjoy this ditty with a nice afternoon mocaccino and some crackers", while NME's called it "proof that hooky house doesn't have to be totally cheesy". On the more mixed side, Nate Patrin of Pitchfork Media called the titular chorus of "Never Say Never" "relatively lacking in that giddy sense of control loss." John Daniel Bull, in his review for The Line of Best Fit, explained the song "combine bolshie beats with '90s house keys, and could quite easily soundtrack a Brit's week in Ibiza or Ayia Napa, but so could a prime example of something Example churned out in an evening".

Music video
The official accompanying music video for "Never Say Never" was written and directed by Saman Kesh, and premiered on 21 July 2014. In the video, Japanese scientists make a "TW3RK-BOT 1.0", the name of a new type of robot that can twerk. It opens with the text, spoken by Japanese narrators: "Without dance there is no love. Without love there is no passion. Without passion there are no humans. 72% have stopped partaking in the art of dancing. And in 15 years, 98% of us will cease to dance." According to Kesh, he wanted the video to have a documentary feel while also being exciting and energetic. In order to have this vibe, however, the video was not supposed to have too much of a happy feel either, and in the editing stages it was tough deciding how much "bubblegum" style the video should have.

Michelle Thompson was a wardrobe stylist for the video. Because the video was planned to take place in Japan, even though it wasn't really filmed there, the creators searched for images online on Japanese and Chinese hazmat suits to order. Then, she was asked by Kesh to modify the outfits to make them "fit sexy" for the women scientists.

The machine spoofs numerous futuristic Japanese robots, including Nobuhiro Takahashi's SHIRI and Mirikan humanoid robots made by Hiroshi Ishiguro. Mary-Ann Russon of the International Business Times said of the video: "While we're not sure how a twerking robot will help to get more people to dance, it's an interesting concept and a sign of the trend of inventing robots today."

Two versions of the video exist. In the one released by Kesh on Vimeo, there is a line where a woman says "Now, we can fuck." However, in the one put on Basement Jaxx's VEVO, this was changed to "Now, we can have sex", due to an agreement with the group's label.

Credits
Video and robot production

Saman Kesh – writing, direction, co-production, editing, read-out motion & "add to cart" graphic 
Shelly Townsend, Matt Factor – executive production
Courtney Davies – line production
Carrie Schreck – pick-up production 
Royce Isaacson – pick-up assistant production
John Moule – commission 
Jesse Sternbaum – assistant direction
Guillermo Garza – cinematography
Michelle Thompson – wardrobe styling 
David McCabe – gaffer
Andrew Simone – branch and bond electric
David Connan – grip
Jake Smith – key grip 
Jonathan Dec – first alternating current
Jordan Gaylor – second alternating current
Andres Cuevas – pick-up alternating current
Tim Nash – branch and bound grip
Paolo Arriola – data management 
Mindy Iller – wardrobe seam sewing 
Mandy Brown – editing
Greg Lang – production design 
Coran Deloy Oberlin – art direction
Derek Hansen – coloring
Mike Kelley – visual effects, read-out motion
Justin Hantz – visual effects consulting, read-out motion
Cosimo Galluzzi – graphics and read-out designs
Brent Kiser – sound design
Ed Hobbs – prologue music

Cast 

Toshiji Takeshima as Mr. Nakamatsu 
Kazuho Yamazaki as Mrs. Nakamatsu 
Nicole Steen as twerker
TJ Yoshizaki, Swee Khor, Muneki Nakamoto, Charles Han and Joe Chua as scientists 
Ben Barrett as truck packer

Personnel
Credits are adapted from liner notes of Junto.

Basement Jaxx – songwriting, production 
Songwriting, vocals – ETML
Co-production –  Baunz
Mixing – Alex Evans, Duncan F. Brown
Background vocals – Yzabel
Kids chorus vocals – Amara Charles, Kiarah and Shamouy Mills-Foster

Charts

Weekly charts

Year-end charts

Release history

References

2014 singles
2014 songs
PIAS Recordings singles
Basement Jaxx songs
Songs written by Felix Buxton
Songs written by Simon Ratcliffe (musician)